The 1921 International Lawn Tennis Challenge was the 16th edition of what is now known as the Davis Cup. In the playoff finals, newcomers Japan surprised Australasia, 4-1, but would fall to defending champions the United States in the Challenge Round. The final was played at the West Side Tennis Club in New York City, United States on 2–5 September.

Teams
The tournament saw a boom in entries, with a record 12 teams entering to challenge for the cup. Argentina, Czechoslovakia, Denmark, India, Japan, the Philippines, and Spain all entered the tournament for the first time, although Argentina and the Philippines withdrew after the draw.

Draw

First round
Czechoslovakia vs. Belgium

Great Britain v Spain

Canada vs. Australasia

Quarterfinals
France vs. India

Australasia vs. Great Britain

Semifinals
India vs. Japan

Australasia vs. Denmark

Final
Japan vs. Australasia

Challenge Round
United States vs. Japan

References

External links
Davis Cup Official Website

Davis Cups by year
International Lawn Tennis Challenge
International Lawn Tennis Challenge